The Monument to Claudio Moyano is an instance of public art in Madrid, Spain.

History and description 

In 1894  (Director–General for Public Instruction) resumed an earlier initiative to erect a statue to Moyano, giving a new impetus to the plan, that had failed to collect enough money up to that moment. The popular subscription (organised by the teachers of the Province of Zamora) proceeded then to collect funds from the teachers of all the Spanish provinces. The managing committee for the monument awarded the design to Agustín Querol in 1896.

Each side of the lower part of the stone pedestal displays a bronze relief attempting to convey feats of the life of Moyano: the moment he reads his teaching project from the podium of the Congress of Deputies; the moment when Isabella II countersigns his famous 1857 Law; an allegory of an "Angel of the Schools", and the frontal relief, related to the inauguration, featuring an allegory of Pheme holding a cartouche that reads:  ("To Mr. Don Claudio Moyano y Samaniego, for the great services rendered to public instruction, the Spanish teaching staff. Year 1990.").

The bronze sculpture topping the tall pedestal represents a solemn Moyano in attitude of reading his laws to the people.

The monument was unveiled at its location at the plaza de Atocha on 11 November 1900. The retinue for the inauguration included  (Minister of Public Instruction),  (Rector of the Central University), Silverio Moyano (nephew of Claudio Moyano), the Mayor of Madrid, the civil governor, council members of the Ayuntamiento and the Provincial Deputation (of Madrid, but there was also representatives of the Deputation of Zamora), and a multitude of representatives of schools from locations all around the country.

The monument endured many moves up and down the city along the tumultuous 20th century (including a first move to the plaza de Luca de Tena, and a second move to some gardens in front of a school). Mayor Enrique Tierno Galván decided to return the monument to its (rough) original location on the occasion of the 125th anniversary of the Moyano Law in 1982, completing the move on 28 March 1982. Municipal architect Joaquín Roldán managed the works pertaining the move.

References 
Citations

Bibliography
 
 

Buildings and structures in Jerónimos neighborhood, Madrid
Monuments and memorials in Madrid
Outdoor sculptures in Madrid
Bronze sculptures in Spain
Sculptures of men in Spain
Statues of politicians